Samuel Charles McCullum (born November 30, 1952) is a former professional American football player who played wide receiver for 10 seasons in the National Football League (NFL) for the Seattle Seahawks and Minnesota Vikings from 1974 through 1983.

Early years
Born in McComb, Mississippi, McCullum moved with his family to Montana in 1967, and was raised in Kalispell. He attended Flathead High School, and was all-state in football, basketball, and track. He then attended Montana State University in Bozeman, where he played football for the Bobcats from 1970–1973, and set a record of 16 career touchdown catches.

Professional career
McCullum was selected by the Minnesota Vikings in ninth round of the 1974 NFL Draft. He played wide receiver for ten seasons for the Vikings and expansion Seattle Seahawks from 1974 through 1983.

McCullum finished his NFL career with 274 receptions for 4,017 yards, and 26 touchdowns.

The NLRB found that the Seahawks illegally discharged McCullum as a result of his participation in the 1982 NFL strike. In 1991, McCullum was awarded $543,000 in backpay.

Halls of fame
In 1993, McCullum was inducted into the Montana State Hall of Fame, in 2011 he was inducted into the Kalispell Legends Wall of Fame, and in 2018 he was inducted into the Montana Football Hall of Fame.

Personal
McCullum is Jewish, having converted to Judaism. He and his wife live in the Seattle area, and have two sons, Jamien and Justin.

See also
List of select Jewish football players

References

External links

1952 births
Living people
People from McComb, Mississippi
American football wide receivers
Montana State Bobcats football players
Seattle Seahawks players
Minnesota Vikings players
Converts to Judaism
Jewish American sportspeople
People from Kalispell, Montana
Converts to Judaism from Christianity
African-American trade unionists
Trade unionists from Montana
21st-century African-American people
21st-century American Jews
20th-century African-American people